The 3rd constituency of the Puy-de-Dôme (French: Troisième circonscription du Puy-de-Dôme) is a French legislative constituency in the Puy-de-Dôme département. Like the other 576 French constituencies, it elects one MP using a two-round electoral system.

Description

The 3rd constituency of the Puy-de-Dôme lies in the south west of the department and includes the western and south western parts of Clermont-Ferrand.

The constituency is most notable for the fact that it was the political base of former French President Valéry Giscard d'Estaing. Giscard d'Estaing was succeeded by his son Louis in 2002, however he was defeated by the Green candidate in 2012. Louis made an attempt to regain the seat at the 2017 elections however he could only manage second place.

Assembly Members

Election results

2022

 
 
|-
| colspan="8" bgcolor="#E9E9E9"|
|-

2017

|- style="background-color:#E9E9E9;text-align:center;"
! colspan="2" rowspan="2" style="text-align:left;" | Candidate
! rowspan="2" colspan="2" style="text-align:left;" | Party
! colspan="2" | 1st round
! colspan="2" | 2nd round
|- style="background-color:#E9E9E9;text-align:center;"
! width="75" | Votes
! width="30" | %
! width="75" | Votes
! width="30" | %
|-
| style="background-color:" |
| style="text-align:left;" | Laurence Vichnievsky
| style="text-align:left;" | Democratic Movement
| MoDEM
| 
| 38.58
| 
| 56.02
|-
| style="background-color:" |
| style="text-align:left;" | Louis Giscard D’Estaing
| style="text-align:left;" | Union of Democrats and Independents
| UDI
| 
| 21.07
| 
| 43.98
|-
| style="background-color:" |
| style="text-align:left;" | Marc Chovin
| style="text-align:left;" | La France Insoumise
| FI
| 
| 11.92
| colspan="2" style="text-align:left;" |
|-
| style="background-color:" |
| style="text-align:left;" | Nicolas Bonnet
| style="text-align:left;" | Ecologist
| ECO
| 
| 11.04
| colspan="2" style="text-align:left;" |
|-
| style="background-color:" |
| style="text-align:left;" | Anne-Marie Carta
| style="text-align:left;" | National Front
| FN
| 
| 6.79
| colspan="2" style="text-align:left;" |
|-
| style="background-color:" |
| style="text-align:left;" | Christophe Serre
| style="text-align:left;" | The Republicans
| LR
| 
| 5.85
| colspan="2" style="text-align:left;" |
|-
| style="background-color:" |
| style="text-align:left;" | Christine Thomas
| style="text-align:left;" | Communist Party
| PCF
| 
| 2.74
| colspan="2" style="text-align:left;" |
|-
| style="background-color:" |
| style="text-align:left;" | Corinne Neveux
| style="text-align:left;" | Debout la France
| DLF
| 
| 1.02
| colspan="2" style="text-align:left;" |
|-
| style="background-color:" |
| style="text-align:left;" | Josiane Mainville
| style="text-align:left;" | Far Left
| EXG
| 
| 0.50
| colspan="2" style="text-align:left;" |
|-
| style="background-color:" |
| style="text-align:left;" | Maëlig Le Guern
| style="text-align:left;" | Independent
| DIV
| 
| 0.50
| colspan="2" style="text-align:left;" |
|-
| colspan="8" style="background-color:#E9E9E9;"|
|- style="font-weight:bold"
| colspan="4" style="text-align:left;" | Total
| 
| 100%
| 
| 100%
|-
| colspan="8" style="background-color:#E9E9E9;"|
|-
| colspan="4" style="text-align:left;" | Registered voters
| 
| style="background-color:#E9E9E9;"|
| 
| style="background-color:#E9E9E9;"|
|-
| colspan="4" style="text-align:left;" | Blank/Void ballots
| 
| 1.78%
| 
| 5.73%
|-
| colspan="4" style="text-align:left;" | Turnout
| 
| 54.52%
| 
| 46.51%
|-
| colspan="4" style="text-align:left;" | Abstentions
| 
| 45.48%
| 
| 53.49%
|-
| colspan="8" style="background-color:#E9E9E9;"|
|- style="font-weight:bold"
| colspan="6" style="text-align:left;" | Result
| colspan="2" style="background-color:" | MoDem GAIN FROM EELV
|}

2012

|- style="background-color:#E9E9E9;text-align:center;"
! colspan="2" rowspan="2" style="text-align:left;" | Candidate
! rowspan="2" colspan="2" style="text-align:left;" | Party
! colspan="2" | 1st round
! colspan="2" | 2nd round
|- style="background-color:#E9E9E9;text-align:center;"
! width="75" | Votes
! width="30" | %
! width="75" | Votes
! width="30" | %
|-
| style="background-color:" |
| style="text-align:left;" | Louis Giscard D’Estaing
| style="text-align:left;" | Union for a Popular Movement
| UMP
| 
| 39.36
| 
| 49.08
|-
| style="background-color:" |
| style="text-align:left;" | Danielle Auroi
| style="text-align:left;" | Europe Ecology – The Greens
| EELV
| 
| 36.42
| 
| 50.92
|-
| style="background-color:" |
| style="text-align:left;" | Patricia Guilhot
| style="text-align:left;" | Left Front
| FG
| 
| 8.08
| colspan="2" style="text-align:left;" |
|-
| style="background-color:" |
| style="text-align:left;" | Marie-Christine Guibert
| style="text-align:left;" | National Front
| FN
| 
| 7.57
| colspan="2" style="text-align:left;" |
|-
| style="background-color:" |
| style="text-align:left;" | Stanislas Renié
| style="text-align:left;" | New Centre
| NC
| 
| 2.53
| colspan="2" style="text-align:left;" |
|-
| style="background-color:" |
| style="text-align:left;" | Philippe Gorce
| style="text-align:left;" | Miscellaneous Left
| DVG
| 
| 2.14
| colspan="2" style="text-align:left;" |
|-
| style="background-color:" |
| style="text-align:left;" | Gérard Weil
| style="text-align:left;" | Independent
| DIV
| 
| 1.08
| colspan="2" style="text-align:left;" |
|-
| style="background-color:" |
| style="text-align:left;" | Chantal Guillaumin
| style="text-align:left;" | Ecologist
| ECO
| 
| 1.03
| colspan="2" style="text-align:left;" |
|-
| style="background-color:" |
| style="text-align:left;" | Carole Saby
| style="text-align:left;" | Ecologist
| ECO
| 
| 0.58
| colspan="2" style="text-align:left;" |
|-
| style="background-color:" |
| style="text-align:left;" | Michèle Aldon
| style="text-align:left;" | Far Left
| EXG
| 
| 0.49
| colspan="2" style="text-align:left;" |
|-
| style="background-color:" |
| style="text-align:left;" | Claude Dufour
| style="text-align:left;" | Far Left
| EXG
| 
| 0.47
| colspan="2" style="text-align:left;" |
|-
| style="background-color:" |
| style="text-align:left;" | Arnaud Beils
| style="text-align:left;" | Independent
| DIV
| 
| 0.24
| colspan="2" style="text-align:left;" |
|-
| colspan="8" style="background-color:#E9E9E9;"|
|- style="font-weight:bold"
| colspan="4" style="text-align:left;" | Total
| 
| 100%
| 
| 100%
|-
| colspan="8" style="background-color:#E9E9E9;"|
|-
| colspan="4" style="text-align:left;" | Registered voters
| 
| style="background-color:#E9E9E9;"|
| 
| style="background-color:#E9E9E9;"|
|-
| colspan="4" style="text-align:left;" | Blank/Void ballots
| 
| 1.53%
| 
| 2.34%
|-
| colspan="4" style="text-align:left;" | Turnout
| 
| 60.87%
| 
| 62.62%
|-
| colspan="4" style="text-align:left;" | Abstentions
| 
| 39.13%
| 
| 37.38%
|-
| colspan="8" style="background-color:#E9E9E9;"|
|- style="font-weight:bold"
| colspan="6" style="text-align:left;" | Result
| colspan="2" style="background-color:" | EELV GAIN FROM UMP
|}

References

3